Journal of Russian & East European Psychology is a bimonthly peer-reviewed academic journal published by Routledge. The journal publishes materials written by authors from the post-Soviet states and Eastern Europe. It was established in 1962 under the title Soviet Psychology and Psychiatry but changed its name to Soviet Psychology in 1966, obtaining its present name in 1992. The editor-in-chief is Pentti Hakkarainen (Vytautas Magnus University). The journal is abstracted and indexed in PsycINFO and EBSCO databases.

References

External links

Publications established in 1962
Psychology journals
English-language journals
Routledge academic journals
Bimonthly journals
Psychiatry journals